The Harlem Valley Rail Trail is a paved rail trail on an abandoned portion of the New York and Harlem Railroad, north of the hamlet of Wassaic and easily accessible by train, one mile north of the start at the Metro-North Railroad Harlem Line terminus in Wassaic. It is owned by the New York State Office of Parks, Recreation and Historic Preservation (OPRHP). It is maintained through an agreement between OPRHP, Dutchess County and the Harlem Valley Rail Trail Association, a private not-for-profit organization.

The former New York and Harlem main line was acquired by the New York Central Railroad in 1864, and became part of the Penn Central Railroad in 1968. After a severe PC bankruptcy in 1970, the line was abandoned for passenger service between Dover Plains and Chatham in 1972, though freight service continued over the line until 1976, when it was abandoned between Millerton and Ghent. The rest of the line was abandoned in 1980, but Metro-North restored service between Dover Plains and Wassaic in 2000. The abandoned rail line was converted into a public park in 1989. The rail trail opened in 1996, and was expanded in 1997, 2000, 2005 and 2020.

References

External links 
 The Harlem Valley Rail Trail
 Tour of the Harlem Line - Photos of the Harlem Valley Rail Trail

Tourist attractions in Dutchess County, New York
Parks in Dutchess County, New York